Arsanjan County is in Fars province, Iran. The capital of the county is the city of Arsanjan. At the 2006 census, the county's population was 40,916 in 9,800 households.The following census in 2011 counted 41,476 people in 11,221 households. At the 2016 census, the county's population was 42,725 in 12,878 households.

Administrative divisions

The population history of Arsanjan County's administrative divisions over three consecutive censuses is shown in the following table. The latest census shows one district, three rural districts, and one city.

See also
Qadamgah (ancient site)

References

 

Counties of Fars Province